Zoe and Charlie is a TVO Kids English retitle of the French series of animated shorts Léa et Gaspard which still airs on Unis. It began airing in 1993 and still airs in 2016.

It had 26 episodes each 5 minutes long, and Alain Jaspard is the co-screenwriter, and it was directed by Gilles Gay.

References

External links

1990s Canadian animated television series
Canadian children's animated television series
Television shows filmed in Montreal
1990s French animated television series
French children's animated television series